Augustopolis may refer to the following Ancient places :

 Augustopolis in Palaestina, ancient city of Palestine and bishopric, later a Latin Catholic titular see
 Augustopolis in Kilikia, ancient city of Kilikia, later a Latin Catholic titular see
 Augustopolis in Phrygia, Ancient city and suffragan bishopric of Synnada in Phrygia, later a Latin Catholic titular see; near the Turkish town Sürmene (Surmeneh).
 Augustopolis, old name of the city of Saragossa in Spain.

See also 
 Augustopol